The 2009 Andalucia Tennis Experience was a women's tennis tournament played on outdoor clay courts. It was the inaugural edition of the Andalucia Tennis Experience, and was an International-level tournament of the 2009 WTA Tour. The event took place at the Club de Tenis Puente Romano in Marbella, Spain, from 6 April until 12 April 2009. Second-seeded Jelena Janković won the singles title.

Finals

Singles

 Jelena Janković defeated  Carla Suárez Navarro, 6–3, 3–6, 6–3
 It was Jankovic's first title of the year and 10th of her career.

Doubles

 Klaudia Jans /  Alicja Rosolska defeated  Anabel Medina Garrigues /  Virginia Ruano Pascual, 6–3, 6–3

External links
Official website
Singles Draw
Doubles Draw
Qualifying Singles Draw

  
Andalucia
Andalucia Tennis Experience
Andalucia